The Italy national under-21 football team is the national under-21 football team of Italy and is controlled by the Italian Football Federation.

The team competes in the UEFA European Under-21 Championship, held every two years. Italy (along with Spain) is the most successful nation in the history of the competition, with five Championships won (1992, 1994, 1996, 2000 and 2004). Italy has also been twice runner-up of the competition, in 1986 and 2013.

From 1990 to 2004 the team established near-total dominance of European Under-21 football, winning five of the seven tournaments.

Italy's Under-21s played the first match at the new Wembley Stadium, on 24 March 2007, against England Under-21s. The game resulted in a 3–3 draw, with Giampaolo Pazzini scoring all 3 goals for the Azzurrini.

Prior to the 2008 Olympic games, Italy U-21s went on to win the 2008 Toulon Tournament by beating Chile (1–0) in the final. It was the first time they had won this tournament, previously their best had been runner-up on two occasions.

UEFA European Under-21 Championship
Since the under-21 competition rules insist that players must be 21 or under at the start of a two-year competition, technically it is an U-23 competition. For this reason, Italy's record in the preceding U-23 competitions is also shown.
 1972: Did not qualify. Finished 2nd of 3 in qualification group.
 1974: Losing quarter-finalists.
 1976: Did not qualify. Finished 2nd of 3 in qualification group.

UEFA U-21 Championship Record

*Red border color indicates tournament was held on home soil.

Olympics football Record

Since 1992 Olympic football changed to a U-23 event, and the European U-21 teams are technically U-23 teams. European national teams qualify for the Olympic football tournament through the UEFA European U-21 Championship.

Before 1992: See Italy national football team
1992: Quarter-finals
1996: Group stage
2000: Quarter-finals
2004: Bronze medal
2008: Quarter-finals
2012: Did not qualify
2016: Did not qualify
2020: Did not qualify
2024: To be determined

Overage players in Olympic Games

Mediterranean Games Record
Mediterranean Games Football tournament was U-23 event in 1993 and 1997.
1993: 4th place
1997: Winners
2001: a U20 event
2005: filled with B team

Honours
 UEFA European Under-21 Championship
 Winner: 1992, 1994, 1996, 2000, 2004
 Runner-up: 1986, 2013

Coaches
1976–1986: Azeglio Vicini
1986–1996: Cesare Maldini
1996–1997: Rossano Giampaglia
1997–2000: Marco Tardelli
2000–2006: Claudio Gentile
2006–2010: Pierluigi Casiraghi
2010–2012: Ciro Ferrara
2012–2013: Devis Mangia
2013–2019: Luigi Di Biagio
2019–present: Paolo Nicolato

Coaching staff

Current technical staff:

Recent results and forthcoming fixtures

Only official matches are listed.

2022

2023

Players
Players born in 2000 or later are eligible for the 2023 UEFA European Under-21 Championship. Players in bold have been already capped with the senior team.

Current squad
The following 28 players have been selected for the friendly matches against Serbia and Ukraine on 24 and 27 March 2023 respectively.

Caps and goals as of 19 November 2022, after the match against Germany.

Recent call-ups
Following are listed players called up in the previous 12 months that are still eligible to represent the Under-21 team.

INJ Withdrew due to injury

Records
Players in bold are still eligible to represent Under-21 team. As of 31 May 2021.

Top appearances
The following is the top 10 most capped under-21 players:

Top goalscorers
The following is the top 10 under-21 goalscorers:

See also
 Italy national football team
 Italy national under-20 football team
 UEFA European Under-21 Championship
 Football at the Summer Olympics

Notes

References

External links

 Official website, Italian language
 Official website, English language
 The Rec.Sport.Soccer Statistics Foundation Contains full record of U-21/U-23 Championships.

 
European national under-21 association football teams
Youth football in Italy